The Artificial Intelligence Applications Institute (AIAI) at the School of Informatics at the University of Edinburgh was a non-profit technology transfer organisation that promoted Artificial Intelligence research.

History 

AIAI was created in July 1983, and received its formal charter from the University of Edinburgh in July 1984. It joined the School of Informatics when the School was created from a number of departments and research institutes in 1998. The Director of AIAI was Austin Tate. In 2019 it became part of a larger research institute named the Artificial Intelligence and its Applications Institute within the School of Informatics.

References

External links
 Artificial Intelligence Applications Institute (AIAI) website (1983-2019)
 Artificial Intelligence and its Applications Institute (AIAI) website (2019-)

Artificial intelligence associations
Applications of artificial intelligence
University of Edinburgh